Brad Griffin is an American college football coach.  He is the head coach of the Southwestern Moundbuilders in Winfield, Kansas and was named to the position on January 21, 2015.  Prior to his appointment, he was defensive coordinator at William Penn University in Oskaloosa, Iowa.  He is the 28th head football coach in Southwestern's 111-year history of football.

Griffin graduated from Nickerson High School in Nickerson, Kansas in 1996.  He started his college football career at Hutchinson Community College and continued at Emporia State University, where he was a two-year starter and team captain under Southwestern alumnus and former University of Minnesota head football coach Jerry Kill.

Head coaching record

References

External links
 Southwestern (KS) profile

Year of birth missing (living people)
Living people
American football running backs
Emporia State Hornets football coaches
Emporia State Hornets football players
Southwestern Moundbuilders football coaches
William Penn Statesmen football coaches
Hutchinson Blue Dragons football players
People from Reno County, Kansas
Coaches of American football from Kansas
Players of American football from Kansas